Katakolo is a seaside town in the municipality of Pyrgos in western Elis, Greece. It is situated on a headland overlooking the Ionian Sea and separating the Gulf of Kyparissia from the rest of the Ionian. The small village of Agios Andreas, which in ancient times was the natural harbour for Ancient Olympia, lies northwest of Katakolo.

History
In the Middle Ages, Katakolo was the site of the fortress of Pontikon or Pontikokastro (Ποντικόν, Ποντικόκαστρο), which the Frankish rulers of the Principality of Achaea called Beauvoir or Belveder. The fortress was built by the Byzantines and taken over by the Franks ca. 1205.

Climate
Katakolo has a hot-summer Mediterranean climate (Köppen climate classification: Csa), with hot, dry summers and mild winters with significant rainfall.

Visitor attractions
The port of Katakolo is a popular stop for cruise ships, offering an opportunity for passengers to visit the site of Olympia. Low hills with forests surround Katakolo. Visitors here have the opportunity to visit the ancient port of Olympia, the sunken ancient city of Pheia. Ancient Pheia was on the other side of the mountain of Ichthys, now Agios Andreas, within walking distance of Katakolo port. The lighthouse of Katakolo was built in 1865. One of the most important sites of Katakolo is the Museum of Ancient Greek Technology.

Katakolo has a big market. It consists of more than sixty shops. Cafeterias, restaurants, clothing and traditional Greek products.

The remains of the medieval Pontikokastro/Belvedere/Beauvoir castle still stand on a hilltop northeast of the modern port, but the castle is mostly ruined and its original appearance can only be surmised.

Historical population

Transport

Rail
A railway station connects Katakolo with Pyrgos and Olympia.

Notable people

Carolos Cantounis aka. Magic Mizrahi (1983-) Jewish music producer of electronic music, well-known in Latin America & Israel. 
Pavlos Haikalis (1959–) actor and member of parliament
Yiannis Latsis (1910–2003) shipping tycoon

Gallery

See also
List of settlements in Elis

Notes

References

External links

Port of Katakolo "John Latsis"
GTP - Katakolo
Katakolon official website

Mediterranean port cities and towns in Greece
Populated places in Elis